Russia participated in the Eurovision Song Contest 2000, held on 13 May 2000 at the Globe Arena in Stockholm, Sweden. Public Russian Television (ORT) returned to the Eurovision Song Contest after a two-year absence following their relegation in 1998. ORT first announced that the Russian entry for the 2000 contest would be chosen through a televised national final. However, the broadcaster later opted to choose the nation's representative internally. The song "Solo", written by Andrew Lane and Brandon Barnes and performed by Alsou, was internally selected to represent the nation. Prior to the contest, the entry was promoted by a music video and live performances in Riga, Tallinn and Saint-Petersburg. Russia performed ninth out of the 24 countries competing in the contest and finished in second place, receiving 155 points and full marks from four countries, marking nation's highest placement in the contest to this point.

Background

Russia missed the 1996 contest when its selected song "Ya eto ya" by Andrey Kosinsky failed to qualify from the qualifying round, was relegated from the 1998 contest due to a poor average score from the preceding contests, and was unable to partake in the 1999 contest after ORT didn't air the previous contest on television, which was a requirement for participation in 1999. To this point, the country's best placing was ninth, which it achieved in 1994 with the song "Vechny strannik" performed by Youddiph. Russia's least successful result was in  when it placed 17th with the song "Kolybelnaya dlya vulkana" by Philipp Kirkorov, receiving 17 points in total.

The Russian national broadcaster ORT broadcasts the event within Russia and organises the selection process for the nation's entry. ORT confirmed their intentions to participate at the Eurovision Song Contest 2000 on 18 December 1999. Along with their participation confirmation, it was announced that a national final will be held to select the Russian entry. However, this aspect was discarded and the broadcaster opted to choose the artist via an internal selection.

Before Eurovision

Internal selection
On 18 December 1999, ORT announced that a national final would take place on 19 February 2000 to select the Russian entry for the Eurovision Song Contest 2000 and opened a submission period for interested artists and composers to submit their entries until 15 February 2000. The broadcaster received over 2000 submissions at the conclusion of the deadline. Plans for the national final were later abandoned by the broadcaster due to the financial problems.

On 6 March 2000, ORT announced that they had internally selected Alsou to represent Russia in the Eurovision Song Contest 2000 with the song "Solo". Alsou's selection as the Russian representative was unanimously decided upon by musical editorial office of ORT. The song, performed entirely in English and is the first song performed entirely in the English language that was selected to represent Russia at the Eurovision Song Contest, was written by Andrew Lane and Brandon Barnes and presented to the public on 15 April 2000. The official music video for the song, directed by Debbie Bourn and filmed in London in mid-March, was also presented to the public in the same month.

Promotion
To promote "Solo" as the Russian Eurovision entry, Alsou embarked on the promotional tour, performing in Vernisazh Club in Riga, Latvia on 8 April 2000, Dekolte Club in Tallinn, Estonia on 9 April, and Oktyabrsky Concert Hall in Saint Petersburg, Russia on 10 and 11 April. Apart from the promotional tour, Alsou also took part in promotional activities in Sweden by appearing on MTV Sweden.

At Eurovision

The Eurovision Song Contest 2000 took place at the Globe Arena in Stockholm, Sweden, on 13 May 2000. According to the Eurovision rules, the 24-country participant list for the contest was composed of: the previous year's winning country and host nation Sweden, "Big Four" countries, the thirteen countries, which had obtained the highest average points total over the preceding five contests, and any eligible countries which did not compete in the 1999 contest. Russia was one of the eligible countries which did not compete in the 1999 contest, and thus were permitted to participate. The running order for the contest was decided by a draw held on 21 November 1999; Russia was assigned to perform 9th at the 2000 contest, following Norway and preceding Belgium. Eurovision Song Contest 2000 was televised in Russia on ORT live on 13 May and in delay on 9 June. The contest broadcast on 9 June had a market share of 3.0% and rating of 15.8% according to Gallup Media.

Prior to the contest, Russia was considered by bookmakers to be the sixth most likely country to win the competition. The Russian performance featured Alsou, dressed in a silver glittery outfit designed by Maria Grachvogel, performing a choreographed routine with two male dancers. The stage colours were predominately blue and black with white lighting. The stage featured LED screen projections of blue smoke. During the performance, Alsou and dancers were also accompanied by three backing vocalists. After the voting concluded, Russia scored 155 points, including 4 sets of highest score of 12 points, from Croatia, Cyprus, Malta and Romania; and placed 2nd. At the time this result was the Russia's best placing in its competitive history, and was the nation's first finish in top 3. After the contest the Russian delegation petitioned for the disqualification of the winner Denmark because a vocoder had been used during their performance. This was not upheld by the EBU.

Voting
The same voting system in use since 1975 was again implemented for 2000 contest, with each country providing 1–8, 10 and 12 points to the ten highest-ranking songs as determined by a selected jury or the viewing public through televoting, with countries not allowed to vote for themselves. Russia opted to assemble a jury panel, consisting of Andrey Makarevich, Maria Katz, Erik Chanturia, Irina Slutskaya, Mihey, Andris Liepa, Valeriya and Elena Yakovleva, to determine which countries would receive their points. The Russian spokesperson, who announced the points awarded by the Russian jury during the final, was Zhanna Agalakova. Below is a breakdown of points awarded to Russia and awarded by Russia in the grand final of the contest. The nation awarded its 12 points to Denmark in the contest.

After Eurovision
Russia's result at the contest was greeted with positive reactions in Russian press; Komsomolskaya Pravda stated that the result was a "sensation" and  Vechernyaya Moskva proclaimed it "a matter of national pride", while Argumenty i Fakty commented that song's triumph is "the first glimpses of the success of domestic performers in the West.". In regards to the result, Alsou herself stated that she was "immensely happy that [she] was able to support the musical glory of the country." Alsou further commented: "I really wanted to be among the best, but we didn't even expect such a result. At best, we counted on the 4th-5th place, because a huge number of stunningly talented performers performed."

Following the contest, "Solo" was released as a CD single, which went on to become a success in Russia; having sold over 64,000 copies by August 2000, song received a platinum certification and become the best-selling single in Russia to this point. Commercially, "Solo" achieved moderate success; the single charted in the lower regions of the airplay charts of Estonia and the United Kingdom while peaking atop of the Europa Plus' Eurohit Top-40 Chart in Russia.

Impact and legacy

Despite the initial mixed reception of performance, a number of publications have retrospectively listed the performance as one of the best Russian Eurovision numbers; the performance has been included in unranked lists of the best Russian Eurovision Song Contest performances by Voice, Glamour and TV Centre. MTS included the performance on their list of "Most Iconic Eurovision performances". In 2021, music critic Artem Makarsky, in an article for The Village, ranked the performance as the ninth-best Russian Eurovision performance.

Various Eurovision participants cited the performance as an influence for their own participations in the contest; in an interview with Moskovsky Komsomolets, 2011 Eurovision winners for Azerbaijan Ell & Nikki have cited inspiration towards Alsou's performance: "Both Eldar and I almost simultaneously, since 2000, began to dream of performing at the competition. For example, I was very inspired by Alsou, her second place in 2000, but Azerbaijan did not participate in Eurovision at that time, and it seemed like a distant dream." 2018 Russian representative Yulia Samoylova has also stated that "[her] dream to get to the Eurovision Song Contest was born when [she] saw the performance of the wonderful singer Alsou at this contest".

Karen Fricker and Milija Gluhovic stated in their book Performing the 'New' Europe: Identities, Feelings and Politics in the Eurovision Song Contest that "it was with Alsou that Russia's financial and artistic investment in Eurovision began." They also credited Russia's success in the contest that year for starting nation's "more focused and concerted pursuit of Eurovision gold", which included "[conscious modeling of] their singers and musical material on Europop". Oliver Lepold from Prinz.de also opined that "it was from that time that Russians began to take the competition very seriously, investing really big money in it." An editor of Lеntа.ru wrote: "Russia has sent its representatives to Eurovision many times before — and all of them, including the aforementioned Pugacheva and Kirkorov, did not even get into the top ten. Against this background, Alsou's second place became a real sensation and was akin to a victory. It is thanks to this result that interest in Eurovision has turned into a national sport in Russia — it seems that no other country in the world takes this music competition so seriously."

References

Further reading
 

2000
Countries in the Eurovision Song Contest 2000
Eurovision